Mitra fusioides is an extinct species of sea snail, a marine gastropod mollusk, in the family Mitridae, the miters or miter snails.

References

fusioides
Gastropods described in 1833